Hans Adler (1880, Vienna – 1957) was a German author of humorous poems, many of which appeared in the magazine Simplicissimus and were later collected in the volume Affentheater.

Works 
Das Städtchen (1926, novel)
Die Nacht vor dem Ultimo (with Rudolf Lothar, 1933, play) - English-language adaptation: The Red Cat
Hau-ruck (under the pen name "Paul Vulpius", 1933, play) - English-language adaptation: Youth at the Helm
 (1934, operetta, based on the music of Johann Strauss II)
Mädchen für alles (with Paul Frank, 1934, play)
Morgen ist Feiertag (with Leo Perutz and Paul Frank, 1935, play) - English-language adaptation: Tomorrow's a Holiday
Tohuwabohu (with Alexander Lernet-Holenia, 1936, play)
Verliebtes Abenteuer (1938, play)

Filmography 
Fanny Elssler, directed by Frederic Zelnik (Germany, 1920, based on the operetta Die Tänzerin Fanny Elßler)
Folies Bergère de Paris, directed by Roy Del Ruth (1935, based on the play Die Nacht vor dem Ultimo)
Lärm um Weidemann, directed by Johann Alexander Hübler-Kahla (Germany, 1935, based on the play Hau-ruck) (uncredited)
Jack of All Trades, directed by Robert Stevenson and Jack Hulbert (UK, 1936, based on the play Hau-ruck)
Mädchen für alles, directed by Carl Boese (Germany, 1937, based on the play Mädchen für alles)
Verliebtes Abenteuer, directed by Hans H. Zerlett (Germany, 1938, based on the play Verliebtes Abenteuer)
, directed by Camillo Mastrocinque (Italy, 1940, based on the play Hau-ruck) (uncredited)
That Night in Rio, directed by Irving Cummings (1941, based on the play Die Nacht vor dem Ultimo)
, directed by Géza von Bolváry (Germany, 1945, based on the operetta Meine Nichte Susanne), unfinished film
Esta é Fina, directed by Luiz de Barros (Brazil, 1948, based on the play Die Nacht vor dem Ultimo)
My Niece Susanne, directed by Wolfgang Liebeneiner (West Germany, 1950, based on the operetta Meine Nichte Susanne)
Escándalo nocturno, directed by Juan Carlos Thorry (Argentina, 1951, based on the play Tohuwabohu)
On the Riviera, directed by Walter Lang (1951, based on the play Die Nacht vor dem Ultimo)
Drei, von denen man spricht, directed by Axel von Ambesser (West Germany, 1953, based on the play Hau-ruck)

Screenwriter 
Sommerliebe, directed by Erich Engel (Germany, 1942)

References
 

1880 births
1957 deaths
Writers from Vienna
German poets
German male poets
Austro-Hungarian emigrants to Germany